Dennis Anfernee Santana Sánchez (born April 12, 1996) is a Dominican professional baseball pitcher for the New York Mets of Major League Baseball (MLB). He has previously played in MLB for the Los Angeles Dodgers and Texas Rangers.

Career

Los Angeles Dodgers
Santana signed with the Los Angeles Dodgers as an international free agent in March 2013. He made his professional debut in 2014 with the Dominican Summer League Dodgers and spent the whole season there, going 2-1 with a 1.05 ERA in twenty games. He pitched 2015 with the Arizona League Dodgers and Ogden Raptors, compiling a combined 2-5 record and 6.42 ERA in 13 games (11 starts), and 2016 with the Great Lakes Loons, posting a 5-9 record and 3.07 ERA with 124 strikeouts in 111.1 innings. He was a Midwest League All-Star with the Loons in 2016.

Santana started 2017 with the Rancho Cucamonga Quakes and was promoted to the Tulsa Drillers during the season. With the two teams, he was 8–7 with a 4.11 ERA in 24 games (21 starts). The Dodgers added him to the 40-man roster on November 20, 2017. He began 2018 with Tulsa but was promoted to the AAA Oklahoma City Dodgers in May. In his debut for them, he struck out 11 in six scoreless innings, for which he was named the Pacific Coast League Pitcher of the Week.

Santana was called up to the majors by the Dodgers for the first time on May 30, 2018 and made his debut on June 1, picking up the win in relief, despite allowing five runs on six hits in 3 innings against the Colorado Rockies. He also hit a two-RBI double in his first major league at-bat. He was scheduled to make his first major league start on June 7 against the Pittsburgh Pirates but suffered a right rotator cuff strain while warming up in the bullpen before the game and was placed on the disabled list, where he remained for the rest of the season.

In 2019, he pitched five innings for the Dodgers, across three appearances, allowing four runs on six hits. In 27 appearances for Oklahoma City (17 starts) he was 5–9 with a 6.94 ERA.

Santana made 12 appearances for the Dodgers during the pandemic-shortened season of 2020, with a 1–2 record and 5.29 ERA. 

After struggling to a 6.00 ERA in 16 appearances to begin the 2021 season, Santana was designated for assignment on June 12, 2021.

Texas Rangers
On June 17, 2021, Santana was traded to the Texas Rangers in exchange for Kelvin Bautista and was assigned to the Triple-A Round Rock Express. He appeared in 63 games for Texas, working to a 3-8 record and 5.22 ERA with 54 strikeouts in 58.2 innings pitched.

New York Mets
On November 15, 2022, Santana was traded to the Atlanta Braves in exchange for cash considerations. On January 13, 2023, Santana signed a one-year, $1 million contract with the Braves, avoiding salary arbitration.

On February 26, 2023, Santana was claimed off waivers by the Minnesota Twins. On March 17, Santana was claimed off waivers by the New York Mets.

References

External links 

1996 births
Living people
Sportspeople from San Pedro de Macorís
Dominican Republic expatriate baseball players in the United States
Major League Baseball players from the Dominican Republic
Major League Baseball pitchers
Los Angeles Dodgers players
Texas Rangers players
Dominican Summer League Dodgers players
Ogden Raptors players
Arizona League Dodgers players
Great Lakes Loons players
Tulsa Drillers players
Oklahoma City Dodgers players
Rancho Cucamonga Quakes players
Round Rock Express players